The Voie Sacrée wind farm is a wind farmer located in the Lorraine region of France. 

It is shared between the cities of Beausite, Raival, Courcelles-sur-aire, Érize-la-petite, and Maurechamp, not far from the Voie Sacrée. The onshore wind farm was proposed and installed in 2007, and today contains 27 Gamesa G90/2000 wind turbines, each with a hub height of 78 meters and diameter of 90 meters. Individually, each of the Voie Sacrée wind turbines has a rated capacity of 2,000 kW, for a total capacity of 54,000 kW for the wind farm. 

In 2013, the power contribution from the Voie Sacrée wind farm accounted for approximately 0.65% of the total wind power in France (8,254 MW). The wind farm developer is SFE Française d’Eoliennes and the farm is currently owned and operated by Sorgenia France. Voie Sacrée is a contributor to French wind power Zone 55.

References

2007 establishments in France
Buildings and structures in Meuse (department)
Wind farms in France